Bruno Aleph Wizard (born Stanley Bernard McQuilan, 1950) is the founder, principal singer and co-writer of the punk groups The Homosexuals and The Rejects. Wizard is also a noted player of the harmonica.

Originally active between 1978 and 1985, Wizard reformed The Homosexuals with new line-ups from 2003. He has been interviewed as a pundit for British television programmes. In 2013 a fly-on-the-wall documentary about his life, The Heart of Bruno Wizard, was screened at The East End Film Festival.

References

External links
 
 Dazed Digital interview, 2015
 Over at The Hotel interview - Gothamist, 7 September 2006
 Astral Glamour  review - Dusted magazine, 4 August 2004 
 PUNKCAST#1178 The Homosexuals live @ Cake Shop, New York on 9 July 2007 (RealPlayer, mp4)

1950 births
Living people
English punk rock singers